Lurton Blassingame (February 10, 1904 – April 1988)  was an American literary agent.

He was born in Fort Smith, Arkansas and went to Columbia University where he studied writing.  His Master's thesis was based on the history of pulp fiction.

His first job was as a writer in Hollywood.  From that job he moved on to found the American Library Foundation with William Allen in 1937.

He was the literary agent for Frank Herbert, Robert A. Heinlein, John Barth, William F. Nolan,  and Rosemary Taylor.  His public relations firm named Houston Branch Associates was sold to Eleanor Wood's Spectrum Literary Agency in 1978.

In 1951, author Robert A. Heinlein dedicated his science fiction book The Puppet Masters "to Lurton Blassingame".  He also used Blassingame as a "care-of" address for form letter responses to fans.

In 1980, literary agent Kirby McCauley dedicated his horror anthology Dark Forces to Blassingame "with admiration and affection".

Heinlein's posthumous 1989 book Grumbles from the Grave consists of his letters. There are more letters to Blassingame than any other correspondent. (And some of Blassingames's letters to Heinlein are included.)

References

External links 
 Guide to the Lurton Blassingame papers at the University of Oregon
 Form letter response to fans

Literary agents
1904 births
1988 deaths
People from Fort Smith, Arkansas
Columbia University School of the Arts alumni